Carlos Smith may refer to:

 G. Carlos Smith (1910–1987), youth leader in the Church of Jesus Christ of Latter-day Saints
 Carlos Smith (footballer) (born 1969), Bahamian football player
 Carlos Guillermo Smith (born 1980), community activist, lobbyist, and politician from Florida
 Carlos Green Smith (1813–1892), American educator